In algebraic geometry, a period is a number that can be expressed as an integral of an algebraic function over an algebraic domain. Sums and products of periods remain periods, so the periods form a ring.

Maxim Kontsevich and Don Zagier gave a survey of periods and introduced some conjectures about them.   Periods also arise in computing the integrals that arise from Feynman diagrams, and there has been intensive work trying to understand the connections.

Definition
A real number is a period if it is of the form

A complex number is a period if its real and imaginary parts are periods.

The coefficients of the rational functions and polynomials can also be generalised to algebraic numbers because irrational algebraic numbers are expressible in terms of areas of suitable domains.

In other words, a (nonnegative) period is the volume of a region in  defined by a polynomial inequality.

Examples
Besides the algebraic numbers, the following numbers are known to be periods:
 The natural logarithm of any positive algebraic number a, which is 
  
 Elliptic integrals with rational arguments
 All zeta constants (the Riemann zeta function of an integer) and multiple zeta values
 Special values of hypergeometric functions at algebraic arguments
 Γ(p/q)q for natural numbers p and q.

An example of a real number that is not a period is given by Chaitin's constant Ω. Any other non-computable number also gives an example of a real number that is not a period. Currently there are no natural examples of computable numbers that have been proved not to be periods, however it is possible to construct artificial examples. Plausible candidates for numbers that are not periods include e, 1/, and the Euler–Mascheroni constant γ.

Properties and motivation
The periods are intended to bridge the gap between the algebraic numbers and the transcendental numbers. The class of algebraic numbers is too narrow to include many common mathematical constants, while the set of transcendental numbers is not countable, and its members are not generally computable.

The set of all periods is countable, and all periods are computable, and in particular definable.

Conjectures
Many of the constants known to be periods are also given by integrals of transcendental functions. Kontsevich and Zagier note that there "seems to be no universal rule explaining why certain infinite sums or integrals of transcendental functions are periods".

Kontsevich and Zagier conjectured that, if a period is given by two different integrals, then each integral can be transformed into the other using only the linearity of integrals (in both the integrand and the domain), changes of variables, and the Newton–Leibniz formula

 

(or, more generally, the Stokes formula).

A useful property of algebraic numbers is that equality between two algebraic expressions can be determined algorithmically. The conjecture of Kontsevich and Zagier would imply that equality of periods is also decidable: inequality of computable reals is known recursively enumerable; and conversely if two integrals agree, then an algorithm could confirm so by trying all possible ways to transform one of them into the other one.

It is conjectured that Euler's number e and the Euler–Mascheroni constant γ are not periods.

Generalizations

The periods can be extended to exponential periods by permitting the integrand  to be the product of an algebraic function and the exponential of an algebraic function. This extension includes all algebraic powers of e, the gamma function of rational arguments, and values of Bessel functions.

Kontsevich and Zagier suggest that there are "indications" that periods can be naturally generalized even further, to include Euler's constant γ. With this inclusion, "all classical constants are periods in the appropriate sense".

See also 
 Jacobian variety
 Gauss–Manin connection
 Mixed motives (math)
 Tannakian formalism

References

Footnotes

Further reading

External links
 PlanetMath: Period

Mathematical constants
Algebraic geometry
Integral calculus